Byblis lamellata is a carnivorous plant in the Byblidaceae family. It is endemic to Australia.

References

 Conran, J.G., A. Lowrie & J. Moyle-Croft 2002. A revision of Byblis (Byblidaceae) in south-western Australia. Nuytsia 15(1): 11–19.

lamellata
Eudicots of Western Australia